Mehdiabad-e Shur (also Romanized as Mehdīābād-e Shūr; also known as Mehdīābād, Mehdīābād Āb Shūr and Mehdi Abad Hoomeh Zarand) is a village in Mohammadabad Rural District, in the Central District of Zarand County, Kerman Province, Iran. At the 2006 census, its population was 88, in 21 families.

References 

Populated places in Zarand County